Rectiostoma is a moth genus of the family Depressariidae.

Species
 Rectiostoma argyrobasis (Duckworth, 1971)
 Rectiostoma callidora (Meyrick, 1909)
 Rectiostoma chrysabasis (Duckworth, 1971)
 Rectiostoma cirrhobasis (Duckworth, 1971)
 Rectiostoma cnecobasis (Duckworth, 1971)
 Rectiostoma earobasis (Duckworth, 1971)
 Rectiostoma eusema (Walsingham, 1914)
 Rectiostoma fernaldella (Riley, 1889)
 Rectiostoma flaviceps (Felder & Rogenhofer, 1875)
 Rectiostoma flinti (Duckworth, 1971)
 Rectiostoma haemitheia (Felder & Rogenhofer, 1875)
 Rectiostoma leuconympha (Meyrick, 1921)
 Rectiostoma ochrobasis (Duckworth, 1971)
 Rectiostoma silvibasis (Duckworth, 1971)
 Rectiostoma thiobasis (Duckworth, 1971)
 Rectiostoma xanthobasis (Zeller, 1875)
 Rectiostoma xuthobasis (Duckworth, 1971)

References

 
Stenomatinae